LoneStar Airways was an airline based in Liberia.

History
It has been slow to start services and its Boeing 727 was parked at Belgrade since October 2004, but for some time was used by Aviogenex under Serbian registration of YU-AKD. The airline claims to be starting services in the West African region using Boeing 737-200 aircraft.

Destinations
In 2006, Lonestar announced a list of destinations that they would start flying to on a regular basis. These are Lagos, Accra, Abidjan, Monrovia, Freetown, Banjul and Dakar.

See also		
 List of defunct airlines of Liberia

Fleet
The LoneStar Airways fleet consisted of one Boeing 727-200 aircraft at April 2005.

References

External links
 

Defunct airlines of Liberia